is a Japanese former actress and tarento. She was represented with Sadeeca.

Biography
Nanamori was born in 1972 in Tokyo.

She made her debut after she became a race queen for the '97 Suntory Nama Beer Campaign Girl and Kamome Service. Nanamori appeared in Shutsudō! Minisuka Police as the second and third generation Minisuka Police in January 1997, and later on October she became a "Won Girl" in the Tokyo Broadcasting System series Wonderful. She appeared in the series until March of the following year.

Nanamori worked as an actress in television dramas and advertisements and played Rose Monster Ru-Baruba-De in Kamen Rider Kuuga in 2000 and Lisa Teagle (Deka Bright) in Tokusou Sentai Dekaranger in 2004, whom she played as a cool woman. She was belonged to the talent agency Sadeeca until 2003 and she is later retired from her career. Nanamori is now married and has a child.

Filmography

TV series

Films, direct-to-video films

Advertisements

Video games

Advertising stills

Stage

Radio

Broadband

Bibliography

Photobooks

Magazines

Notes

References

Japanese entertainers
1972 births
Living people
Actresses from Tokyo
20th-century Japanese actresses
21st-century Japanese actresses